Oswaldo Augusto Vizcarrondo Araujo (born 31 May 1984) is a Venezuelan professional footballer who plays as a centre-back for French amateur club AS Sautron. He is a former Venezuela international.

An international since 2004, Vizcarrondo has reached more than 80 appearances and 7 goals for La Vinotinto and was part of the historical 2011 Copa América fourth place squad.

Since 2022 is manager of FC Nantes (women)

International career
On 15 November 2011, Vizcarrondo scored the only goal in a 1–0 victory over Bolivia, a result that lifted Venezuela into a tie for first place in the World Cup qualifying standings.

International goals

Honours

Club
Caracas
 Primera División (2): 2003–04, 2006–07, 2008–09
 Torneo de Clausura (2): 2004, 2007
 Torneo de Apertura (1): 2003

Once Caldas
 Torneo de Finalización (1): 2010

International
 Copa América (1): Fourth place 2011

References

External links
 Oswaldo Vizcarrondo at Football-Lineups
 
 

1984 births
Living people
Association football central defenders
Venezuelan footballers
Venezuela international footballers
Venezuelan people of Basque descent
2007 Copa América players
2011 Copa América players
2015 Copa América players
Copa América Centenario players
Caracas FC players
Club Olimpia footballers
Once Caldas footballers
Deportivo Anzoátegui players
Olimpo footballers
Club América footballers
Club Atlético Lanús footballers
FC Nantes players
ES Troyes AC players
Venezuelan expatriate footballers
Expatriate footballers in Argentina
Venezuelan expatriate sportspeople in Argentina
Expatriate footballers in Paraguay
Venezuelan expatriate sportspeople in Paraguay
Expatriate footballers in Colombia
Venezuelan expatriate sportspeople in Colombia
Expatriate footballers in Mexico
Venezuelan expatriate sportspeople in Mexico
Expatriate footballers in France
Venezuelan expatriate sportspeople in France
Liga MX players
Ligue 1 players
Categoría Primera A players
Argentine Primera División players
Footballers from Caracas